Robert Belza (born 9 November 1926) was a Czech weightlifter. He competed in the men's lightweight event at the 1952 Summer Olympics.

References

External links

1926 births
Possibly living people
Czech male weightlifters
Olympic weightlifters of Czechoslovakia
Weightlifters at the 1952 Summer Olympics
Place of birth missing